The Cârțibavul Mare is a left tributary of the river Someșul Mare in Romania. It discharges into the Someșul Mare in Șanț.

References

Rivers of Romania
Rivers of Bistrița-Năsăud County